Ulf Sjösten (born April 8, 1954) is a Swedish politician of the Moderate Party, member of the Riksdag from 2002 to 2008.

References

Members of the Riksdag from the Moderate Party
Living people
1954 births
Members of the Riksdag 2002–2006
Place of birth missing (living people)
Members of the Riksdag 2006–2010